The McInteer Villa is a historic house in Atchison, Kansas. It was built in 1889-1890 for an Irish immigrant. It is listed on the National Register of Historic Places.

History
The house was built in 1889-1890 for John McInteer, an Irish immigrant who made a fortune from selling harnesses and saddles. McInteer married twice, and the house was inherited after his death by his second wife, whose brother was Judge Charles J. Conlon. It was later acquired by Isabel Altus, "a retired professional violinist and an eccentric."

Architectural significance
The house was designed in the Victorian architectural style. It has been listed on the National Register of Historic Places since March 26, 1975.

References

Houses on the National Register of Historic Places in Kansas
National Register of Historic Places in Atchison County, Kansas
Victorian architecture in Kansas
Houses completed in 1890